Samba Fall (born 7 September 1964), is a Mauritanian Olympic sprinter.

Fall competed at the 1992 Summer Olympics held in Barcelona, he entered the 400 metres he finished 8th in his heat so didn't advance to the next round.

References

1964 births
Living people
Olympic athletes of Mauritania
Mauritanian male sprinters
Athletes (track and field) at the 1992 Summer Olympics